Scenedra is a genus of snout moths described by Edward Meyrick in 1884.

Species
 Scenedra decoratalis (Walker, [1866])
 Scenedra umbrosalis (Wileman, 1911)

References

Pyralini
Pyralidae genera